CBK could refer to:

 CBK (AM), a radio station in Watrous, Saskatchewan, Canada
 Central Bank of Kenya
 Central Bank of Kuwait
 Commercial Bank of Kuwait
 CISSP Common Body of Knowledge, a collection of topics relevant to information security professionals around the world
 Comeback Kid (band), a Canadian band
 Chandrika Bandaranaike Kumaratunga, former president of Sri Lanka
 CBK, ISO 639-3 language code for Chavacano
 CBK, NYSE symbol for clothing retailer Christopher & Banks
 College basketball